The Closed Circle may refer to:

 The Closed Circle (novel), a novel by Jonathan Coe
The Closed Circle: An interpretation of the Arabs, a book by David Pryce-Jones

See also
 Closed circle, a type of argument that is unfalsifiable
 Closed circle of suspects, a common element in detective fiction